Louis Dieudonné Berlinguette, last name occasionally spelt as Berlinquette, (May 26, 1887 – June 1, 1959) was a Canadian professional ice hockey left winger who played eight seasons in the National Hockey League for the Montreal Canadiens, Montreal Maroons and Pittsburgh Pirates. He also spent six seasons with the Canadiens in the National Hockey Association prior to the inception of the NHL.

Louis Berlinguette won the Stanley Cup with the Montreal Canadiens in 1916 against the Portland Rosebuds. He was also a member of the Canadiens when they played in the 1919 Stanley Cup Finals against the Seattle Metropolitans, a series which was called off due to the Spanish flu pandemic with the two team having won two games each.

Career statistics

Regular season and playoffs

References

Notes

External links
 

1887 births
1959 deaths
Canadian ice hockey left wingers
Haileybury Comets players
Ice hockey people from Quebec
Montreal Canadiens (NHA) players
Montreal Canadiens players
Montreal Maroons players
People from Outaouais
Pittsburgh Pirates (NHL) players
Quebec Castors players
Saskatoon Sheiks players
Stanley Cup champions